Daniel Kabir Mustafá (born 2 August 1984) is a retired Palestinian footballer who played as a centre-back.

Club career
The son of a father of Palestinian descent and a mother of Italian and Spanish ancestries, Mustafá was born in Bell Ville, Córdoba. He started his playing career in the lower leagues of Argentine football, representing in quick succession Córdoba province clubs Talleres de Córdoba, Racing de Córdoba and Alumni de Villa María.

In 2008, Mustafá played for another modest side, Club Sportivo Ben Hur of Rafaela, and had his first abroad experience in the following summer with Portugal's C.F. Estrela da Amadora. With the latter team, he appeared in half of the Primeira Liga matches as they were relegated due to irregularities.

Mustafa's next stop was in Spain, with Segunda División club SD Huesca. There, he only featured in one (incomplete) match, and was released in mid-January 2010 after reporting later than expected from the Christmas break, returning to the other country in the Iberian Peninsula as he joined league strugglers C.F. Os Belenenses, also Lisbon-based.

On 14 June 2010, after suffering another top flight relegation in Portugal, Mustafá returned to Argentina, moving to Primera División side Club Atlético Tigre. In January 2013, after brief spells with Independiente José Terán and Boca Unidos, he joined San Marcos de Arica in the Chilean Primera División.

In spite of his team's relegation, Mustafá continued with the club but, in April 2014, returned to his homeland after the 8.2 earthquake.

International career
In 2006, talks between Mustafá and the Palestinian Football Association in order for the former to represent the latter's national team took place, but no agreement was reached. Finally, he was selected for the squad that competed in the 2012 WAFF Championship, gaining his first cap on 8 December in a 1–2 loss against Kuwait.

References

External links
 
 
 
 
 
 

1984 births
Living people
Sportspeople from Córdoba Province, Argentina
Argentine people of Palestinian descent
Argentine footballers
Palestinian footballers
Association football defenders
Argentine Primera División players
Talleres de Córdoba footballers
Club Atlético Tigre footballers
Boca Unidos footballers
Primeira Liga players
C.F. Estrela da Amadora players
C.F. Os Belenenses players
Segunda División players
SD Huesca footballers
C.S.D. Independiente del Valle footballers
Chilean Primera División players
Primera B de Chile players
San Marcos de Arica footballers
Ñublense footballers
Palestine international footballers
Argentine expatriate footballers
Palestinian expatriate footballers
Expatriate footballers in Portugal
Expatriate footballers in Spain
Expatriate footballers in Ecuador
Expatriate footballers in Chile
Expatriate footballers in Venezuela
Palestinian expatriate sportspeople in Argentina
Palestinian expatriate sportspeople in Portugal
Palestinian expatriate sportspeople in Chile
Palestinian expatriate sportspeople in Venezuela
2019 AFC Asian Cup players